Sosefo Sakalia (born 14 December 1991) is a Tongan rugby union player. He plays in the hooker position for the Romania based SuperLiga side, Steaua București. Sakalia also represents Tonga at international level.

Sakalia made his international debut at the 2015 World Rugby Pacific Nations Cup in a match against the Canucks. Before rejoining Steaua București in 2016, Sakalia also played for Olimpia București during 2015.

References

External links

 
 
 

1991 births
Living people
Tongan rugby union players
Tonga international rugby union players
CSM București (rugby union) players
CSA Steaua București (rugby union) players
Expatriate rugby union players in Romania
Tongan expatriate sportspeople in Romania
People from Nukuʻalofa
Rugby union hookers
Peñarol Rugby players